I Was Happy Here is a 1966 drama film directed by Desmond Davis. The film won three awards at the 1966 San Sebastián International Film Festival. The film was released in the U.S. as Time Lost and Time Remembered.

Plot
Cass follows the bright lights to London, but is quickly disillusioned. She meets (and marries) Doctor Langdon, but soon realises her desire to return to her home by the sea, and her first love, Colin.

Cast
 Sarah Miles as Cass Langdon
 Cyril Cusack as Hogan
 Julian Glover as Dr. Matthew Langdon
 Sean Caffrey as Colin Foley
 Maire Keane as Barkeeper
 Eve Belton as Kate
 Cardew Robinson as Gravedigger

Production
The film was the first in a series of co production between the NFFC and Rank. It was originally called Passage of Love.

Filming
Filming began in June 1965 with a six-week shoot in County Clare, Ireland, followed by three weeks in London and another week in Ireland.

The movie was filmed in Lahinch, County Clare, Ireland and Twickenham Studios, London, England.

Reception
The film received some supportive reviews but was a box office disappointment and lost money.

Critical reception
Allmovie noted "a softly beautiful, hauntingly poetic little film, a fragile piece of filmmaking that in other hands could come off as either unbearably precious or pretentious. Fortunately, Time is shepherded by Desmond Davis, who handles the material with just the right degree of sensitivity;" however, Time Out called it "A horribly pretentious and sentimental film which still manages to retain a degree of emotional power, with moments of real intensity and conviction...The film is certainly much better than Davis' earlier Irish story The Girl with Green Eyes (also adapted from Edna O'Brien), but it's dogged by the awful tricks of overemphasis which he seems to have learned from his patron Tony Richardson"; while TV Guide thought it, "Slow in pace, with beautiful photography and fine acting, this is a well-told tale of disenchantment and resignation."

Notes

References

External links

1966 films
1966 romantic drama films
British black-and-white films
British romantic drama films
Films based on short fiction
Films directed by Desmond Davis
Films scored by John Addison
Films set in Ireland
Films set in London
Films shot in County Clare
Films shot in London
1960s English-language films
1960s British films